Odna Zhizn is a symphonic poem by the American composer Christopher Rouse.  The work was commissioned by the New York Philharmonic and was completed in 2009.  It was first performed on February 10, 2010, at Avery Fisher Hall in New York City, by the New York Philharmonic under the direction of Alan Gilbert.

Composition

Background
Rouse composed Odna Zhizn as a tribute to an unnamed friend, using a musical code to spell names and phrases in what Rouse called "a private love letter."  In the program notes to the score, Rouse wrote:
In a September 2016 interview on All Things Considered, Rouse revealed that piece was written for his wife Natasha, whom he married earlier that year.  Describing the more unpleasant aspects of the piece, he remarked, "[Natasha] was sexually abused as a child, so she ran away from home at 16 and decided to hitchhike out west. One of the people who picked her up held her for three days and raped her repeatedly. She ended up in Arizona in Tucson and she was homeless, so she was living under a bridge and eating out of dumpsters. And all of that before the age of 18." He added, "I certainly couldn't have survived that, I don't think, and I'm not sure most people could either.  But that's why the fact that she is this warmhearted, wonderful person is all the more amazing."

Instrumentation
The work is scored for three flutes (3rd doubling piccolo), two oboes, English horn, two clarinets, bass clarinet, two bassoons, contrabassoon, four French horns, three trumpets, three trombones, tuba, timpani, three percussionists, harp, celesta, and strings.

Reception
Reviewing the world premiere of Odna Zhizn, Allan Kozinn of The New York Times called the piece "a magical score" and said:
Fellow composer Joel Puckett also praised the work, writing for The Baltimore Sun:

References

Compositions by Christopher Rouse
2009 compositions
Symphonic poems
21st-century classical music
Music commissioned by the New York Philharmonic